The Spokane Hills,  el. , is a set of major foothills of the Big Belt Mountains to the east of Helena, Montana in Lewis and Clark County, Montana.  They lie between the Helena Valley and Canyon Ferry Reservoir.

See also
 List of mountain ranges in Montana

Notes

Mountain ranges of Montana
Landforms of Lewis and Clark County, Montana